Platzer is a surname. Notable people with the surname include:

Birgit Platzer (born 1993), Austrian luger
Jacob Platzer, Italian luger
Johann Georg Platzer (1704–1761), Austrian painter and draughtsman
Kyle Platzer (born 1995), Canadian hockey player 
Martin Platzer (born 1963), Austrian ice hockey player
Norwin Platzer (born 1962), Swiss handball player
Peter Platzer (1910–1959), Austrian footballer
Reinhold Platzer (born 1939), Austrian weightlifter
Tomas Platzer (born 1969), German bobsledder and skeleton racer